Kayoa (also Kaioa), or in the native language Pulau Urimatiti, is a group of 66 islands, part of the Maluku Islands. It is located in South Halmahera Regency, part of North Maluku Province of Indonesia.

Geography

The Kayoa Islands are near the southern end of a chain of volcanic islands off the western coast of Halmaherato (Halmahera region), to the south of Makian and to the north of Bacan. The 66 islands cover a land area of 179.97 km2. The main island is about 10 miles (16 km) long, about 9 miles (14.5 km) south of Makian with a line of hills along most of its length. The group forms four districts within South Halmahera Regency (although Kayoa Barat District - comprising Muari Island and 4 smaller islands - is actually closer to the Bacan Islands than to Kayoa Island), and it had a total population of 20,176 at the 2010 Census and 23,111 at the 2020 Census. The official estimate for mid 2021 was 23,226.

The islands were for centuries the only place in the world where cloves were produced. Kayoa lies on the equator and is subject to regular heavy rain in the two monsoon seasons, which are December to March and June to July.

The stratovolcano Mount Tigalalu lies at the western end of Kayoa, partly flanked by coral limestones. However, Kayoa island differs from its neighbours in being composed mainly of sedimentary rather than volcanic rock. Its western side consists of terraces of raised coral limestone with pumice and beach sand.

Languages and archaeology

There are two native languages on Kayoa island, as well as Indonesian. The language named West Makian, spoken by about 12,000 people in Kayoa and its outlying islands, is one of the North Halmahera languages, which appear to fall within the West Papuan family. The language named Taba or East Makian is one of the Austronesian languages.

Archaeological evidence shows a foraging culture on Kayoa before around 3,500 years ago, changing at that time to an agricultural way of life with animals including pigs and dogs, red-slipped pottery, shell bracelets and beads, and polished stone tools such as adzes. This change shows the arrival on Kayoa of a new culture by 1500 BC. From 2,000 years ago the islands started to trade spices to India and beyond. Chinese copper money is found in jar burials of between 2,000 and 1,000 years ago in the Uattamdi cave shelter on Kayoa, implying that trade in cloves began early on the island. With the jars are glass beads, pieces of bronze and iron, and large shells from the coral reef. One of the burial vessels has rectangular and triangular patterns like those found at Leang Buidane but not on nearby islands.

Natural history

Naturalist Alfred Russel Wallace visited Kayoa, as described in his 1869 book The Malay Archipelago. He records that

References

Bibliography

 

Islands of the Maluku Islands
Landforms of North Maluku